Hirtudiscus is a genus of gastropods belonging to the family Scolodontidae.

The species of this genus are found in Southern America.

Species:

Hirtudiscus antioquiensis 
Hirtudiscus boyacensis 
Hirtudiscus comatus 
Hirtudiscus curei 
Hirtudiscus hirtus 
Hirtudiscus triserialis

References

Gastropods